Auckland (pronounced ) is a large metropolitan city in the North Island of New Zealand. While Europeans continue to make up the plurality of Auckland's population, the city became multicultural and cosmopolitan in the late-20th century, with Asians accounting for 31% of the city's population in 2018. Auckland has the eighth largest proportion of foreign born residents in the world, with 41% of its residents born overseas. With its large population of Pasifika New Zealanders, the city is also home to the biggest ethnic Polynesian population in the world.

Auckland lies between the Hauraki Gulf to the east, the Hunua Ranges to the south-east, the Manukau Harbour to the south-west, and the Waitākere Ranges and smaller ranges to the west and north-west. The surrounding hills are covered in rainforest and the landscape is dotted with 53 volcanic centres that make up the Auckland Volcanic Field. The central part of the urban area occupies a narrow isthmus between the Manukau Harbour on the Tasman Sea and the Waitematā Harbour on the Pacific Ocean. Auckland is one of the few cities in the world to have a harbour on each of two separate major bodies of water.

The Auckland isthmus was first settled  and was valued for its rich and fertile land. The Māori population in the area is estimated to have peaked at 20,000 before the arrival of Europeans. After a British colony was established in New Zealand in 1840, William Hobson, then Lieutenant-Governor of New Zealand, chose Auckland as its new capital. He named the area after George Eden, Earl of Auckland, British First Lord of the Admiralty. Māori–European conflict over land in the region led to war in the mid-19th century. In 1865, Auckland was replaced by Wellington as the capital, but continued to grow, initially because of its port and the logging and gold-mining activities in its hinterland, and later because of pastoral farming (especially dairy farming) in the surrounding area, and manufacturing in the city itself. It has been the nation's largest city throughout most of its history. Today, Auckland's central business district is New Zealand's leading economic hub. It also has a thriving culture that has influenced others across the world, built on its dynamic arts scene and a richly multicultural history.

The University of Auckland, founded in 1883, is the largest university in New Zealand. The city's significant tourist attractions include national historic sites, festivals, performing arts, sports activities, and a variety of cultural institutions, such as the Auckland War Memorial Museum, the Museum of Transport and Technology, and the Auckland Art Gallery Toi o Tāmaki. Its architectural landmarks include the Harbour Bridge, the Town Hall, the Ferry Building and the Sky Tower, which is the second tallest building in the Southern Hemisphere after Thamrin Nine. The city is served by Auckland Airport, which handles around 2 million international passengers a month. Despite being one of the most expensive cities in the world, Auckland is recognised as one of the world's most liveable cities, ranking third in the 2019 Mercer Quality of Living Survey and at first place in a 2021 ranking of the Global Liveability Ranking by The Economist.

History

Early history
The Auckland isthmus was settled by Māori circa 1350, and was valued for its rich and fertile land. Many pā (fortified villages) were created, mainly on the volcanic peaks. By the early 1700s, Te Waiohua, a confederation of tribes such as Ngā Oho, Ngā Riki and Ngā Iwi, became the main influential force on the Auckland isthmus, with major pā located at Maungakiekie / One Tree Hill, Māngere Mountain and Maungataketake. The confederation came to an end around 1741, when paramount chief Kiwi Tāmaki was killed in battle by Ngāti Whātua hapū Te Taoū chief Te Waha-akiaki. From the 1740s onwards, Ngāti Whātua Ōrākei became the major influential force on the Auckland isthmus. The Māori population in the area is estimated to have been about 20,000 before the arrival of Europeans. The introduction of firearms at the end of the eighteenth century, which began in Northland, upset the balance of power and led to devastating intertribal warfare beginning in 1807, causing iwi who lacked the new weapons to seek refuge in areas less exposed to coastal raids. As a result, the region had relatively low numbers of Māori when settlement by European New Zealanders began.

On 20 March 1840 in the Manukau Harbour area where Ngāti Whātua farmed, paramount chief Apihai Te Kawau signed Te Tiriti o Waitangi (the te reo Māori translation of the Treaty of Waitangi). Ngāti Whātua sought British protection from Ngāpuhi as well as a reciprocal relationship with the Crown and the Church. Soon after signing Te Tiriti, Ngāti Whātua Ōrākei made a tuku (strategic gift) of 3,500 acres (1,400 hectares) of land on the Waitematā Harbour to the new Governor of New Zealand, William Hobson, for the new capital, which Hobson named for George Eden, Earl of Auckland, then Viceroy of India. Auckland was founded on 18 September 1840 and was officially declared New Zealand's capital in 1841, and the transfer of the administration from Russell (now Old Russell) in the Bay of Islands was completed in 1842. However, even in 1840 Port Nicholson (later renamed Wellington) was seen as a better choice for an administrative capital because of its proximity to the South Island, and Wellington became the capital in 1865. After losing its status as capital, Auckland remained the principal city of the Auckland Province until the provincial system was abolished in 1876.

In response to the ongoing rebellion by Hōne Heke in the mid-1840s, the government encouraged retired but fit British soldiers and their families to migrate to Auckland to form a defence line around the port settlement as garrison soldiers. By the time the first Fencibles arrived in 1848, the Northern War had concluded. Outlying defensive towns were then constructed to the south, stretching in a line from the port village of Onehunga in the west to Howick in the east. Each of the four settlements had about 800 settlers; the men were fully armed in case of emergency, but spent nearly all their time breaking in the land and establishing roads.

In the early 1860s, Auckland became a base against the Māori King Movement, and the 12,000 Imperial soldiers stationed there led to a strong boost to local commerce. This, and continued road building towards the south into the Waikato region, enabled Pākehā (European New Zealanders) influence to spread from Auckland. The city's population grew fairly rapidly, from 1,500 in 1841 to 3,635 in 1845, then to 12,423 by 1864. The growth occurred similarly to other mercantile-dominated cities, mainly around the port and with problems of overcrowding and pollution. Auckland's population of ex-soldiers was far greater than that of other settlements: about 50 percent of the population was Irish, which contrasted heavily with the majority English settlers in Wellington, Christchurch or New Plymouth. The majority of settlers in the early period were assisted by receiving cheap passage to New Zealand.

Modern history

Trams and railway lines shaped Auckland's rapid expansion in the early first half of the 20th century. However, after the Second World War the city's transport system and urban form became increasingly dominated by the motor vehicle. Arterial roads and motorways became both defining and geographically dividing features of the urban landscape. They also allowed further massive expansion that resulted in the growth of suburban areas such as the North Shore (especially after the construction of the Auckland Harbour Bridge in the late 1950s), and Manukau City in the south.

Economic deregulation in the mid-1980s led to very dramatic changes to Auckland's economy and many companies relocated their head offices from Wellington to Auckland. The region was now the nerve centre of the entire national economy. Auckland also benefited from a surge in tourism, which brought 75 percent of New Zealand's international visitors through its airport. Auckland's port handled 31 percent of the country's container trade in 2015.

The face of urban Auckland changed when the government's immigration policy began allowing immigrants from Asia in 1986. This has led to Auckland becoming a multi-cultural city, with people of all ethnic backgrounds. According to the 1961 census data, Māori and Pacific Islanders comprised 5 percent of Auckland's population; Asians less than 1 percent. By 2006 the Asian population had reached 18.0 percent in Auckland, and 36.2 percent in the central city. New arrivals from Hong Kong, Taiwan and Korea gave a distinctive character to the areas where they clustered, while a range of other immigrants introduced mosques, Hindu temples, halal butchers and ethnic restaurants to the suburbs.

Geography

Scope

The boundaries of Auckland are imprecisely defined. The Auckland urban area, as it is defined by Statistics New Zealand under the Statistical Standard for Geographic Areas 2018 (SSGA18), spans  and extends to Long Bay in the north, Swanson in the north-west, and Runciman in the south. Auckland's functional urban area (commuting zone) extends from just south of Warkworth in the north to Meremere in the south, incorporating the Hibiscus Coast in the northeast, Helensville, Parakai, Muriwai, Waimauku, Kumeu-Huapai, and Riverhead in the northwest, Beachlands-Pine Harbour and Maraetai in the east, and Pukekohe, Clarks Beach, Patumāhoe, Waiuku, Tuakau and Pōkeno (the latter two in the Waikato region) in the south. Auckland forms New Zealand's largest urban area.

The Auckland urban area lies within the Auckland Region, an administrative region that takes its name from the city. The region encompasses the city centre, as well as suburbs, surrounding towns, nearshore islands, and rural areas north and south of the urban area.

The Auckland central business district (CBD)—the city centre—is the most built-up area of the region.

Harbours and gulf

The central areas of the city are located on the Auckland isthmus, less than two kilometres wide at its narrowest point, between Māngere Inlet and the Tāmaki River. There are two harbours surrounding this isthmus: Waitematā Harbour to the north, which extends east to the Hauraki Gulf and thence to the Pacific Ocean, and Manukau Harbour to the south, which opens west to the Tasman Sea.

Bridges span parts of both harbours, notably the Auckland Harbour Bridge crossing the Waitematā Harbour west of the central business district. The Māngere Bridge and the Upper Harbour Bridge span the upper reaches of the Manukau and Waitematā Harbours, respectively. In earlier times, portages crossed the narrowest sections of the isthmus.

Several islands of the Hauraki Gulf are administered as part of the Auckland Region, though they are not part of the Auckland urban area. Parts of Waiheke Island effectively function as Auckland suburbs, while various smaller islands near Auckland are mostly zoned 'recreational open space' or are nature sanctuaries.

Climate
Under the Köppen climate classification, Auckland has an oceanic climate (Köppen climate classification Cfb), while according to the National Institute of Water and Atmospheric Research (NIWA), its climate is classified as subtropical with warm humid summers and mild damp winters. It is the warmest main centre of New Zealand.

Snowflakes were also seen on 28 July 1930 and 15 August 2011. 

Frosts in Auckland are infrequent and often localised. Henderson Riverpark receives an annual average of 27.4 ground frosts per year, while Auckland Airport receives an annual average of 8.7 ground frosts per year. 

Average sea temperature around Auckland varies throughout the year. Water temperature is warmest in February when it averages , while in August, water temperature is at its coolest, averaging .

Prevailing winds in Auckland are predominantly from the southwest. During the summer months there is often a sea breeze in Auckland which starts in the morning and dies down again in the evening. The early morning calm on the isthmus during settled weather, before the sea breeze rises, was described as early as 1853: "In all seasons, the beauty of the day is in the early morning. At that time, generally, a solemn stillness holds, and a perfect calm prevails...".

Fog is a common occurrence for Auckland, especially in autumn and winter. Whenuapai Airport experiences an average of 44 fog days per year. 

Auckland occasionally suffers from air pollution due to fine particle emissions. There are also occasional breaches of guideline levels of carbon monoxide. While maritime winds normally disperse the pollution relatively quickly it can sometimes become visible as smog, especially on calm winter days.

Volcanoes

The city of Auckland straddles the Auckland Volcanic Field, an area which in the past, produced at least 53 small volcanic centers over the last ~193,000 years, represented by a range of surface features including maars (explosion craters), tuff rings, scoria cones, and lava flows. It is fed entirely by basaltic magma sourced from the mantle at a depth of 70–90 km below the city, and is unrelated to the explosive, subduction-driven volcanism of the Taupō Volcanic Zone in the Central North Island region of Aotearoa New Zealand, ~250 km away. The Auckland Volcanic Field is considered to be a monogenetic volcanic field, with each volcano erupting only a single time, usually over a timeframe of weeks to years before cessation of activity. Future eruptive activity remains a threat to the city, and will likely occur at a new, unknown location within the field. The most recent activity occurred approximately 1450 AD at the Rangitoto Volcano. This event was witnessed by Māori occupants of the area, making it the only eruption within the Auckland Volcanic Field thus far to have been observed by humans.

The Auckland Volcanic Field has contributed greatly to the growth and prosperity of the Auckland Region since the area was settled by humans. Initially, the maunga (scoria cones) were occupied and established as pā (fortified settlements) by Māori due to the strategic advantage their elevation provided in controlling resources and key portages between the Waitematā and Manukau harbours. The rich volcanic soils found in these areas also proved ideal for the cultivation of crops, such as kumara. Following European arrival, many of the maunga were transformed into quarries to supply the growing city with aggregate and building materials, and as a result were severely damaged or entirely destroyed. A number of the smaller maar craters and tuff rings were also removed during earthworks. Most of the remaining volcanic centres are now preserved within recreational reserves administered by Auckland Council, the Department of Conservation, and the Tūpuna Maunga o Tāmaki Makaurau Authority.

Demographics

The city has a population larger than the entire South Island.

The Auckland urban area had a usual resident population of 1,346,091 at the 2018 New Zealand census, an increase of 122,343 people (10.0%) since the 2013 census, and an increase of 212,484 people (18.7%) since the 2006 census. There were 665,202 males and 680,886 females, giving a sex ratio of 0.977 males per female. Of the total population, 269,367 people (20.0%) were aged up to 15 years, 320,181 (23.8%) were 15 to 29, 605,823 (45.0%) were 30 to 64, and 150,720 (11.2%) were 65 or older.

Culture and identity 
Many ethnic groups, since the late 20th century, have had an increasing presence in Auckland, making it by far the country's most cosmopolitan city. Historically, Auckland's population has been of majority European origin, though the proportion of those of Asian or other non-European origins has increased in recent decades due to the removal of restrictions directly or indirectly based on race. Europeans continue to make up the plurality of the city's population, but no longer constitute a majority after decreasing in proportion from 54.6% to 48.1% between the 2013 and 2018 censuses. Asians now form the second-largest ethnic group, making up nearly one-third of the population. Auckland is home to the largest ethnic Polynesian population of any city in the world, with a sizable population of Pacific Islanders (Pasifika) and indigenous Māori people. 

At the 2018 census, 647,811 people (48.1%) living in the Auckland urban area were European/Pākehā, 424,917 (31.6%) were Asian, 235,086 (17.5%) were Pacific peoples, 154,620 (11.5%) were Māori, 33,672 (2.5%) were Middle Eastern, Latin American and/or African (MELAA), and 13,914 (1.0%) were other ethnicities (totals add to more than 100% since people could identify with multiple ethnicities).

Immigration to New Zealand is heavily concentrated towards Auckland (partly for job market reasons). This strong focus on Auckland has led the immigration services to award extra points towards immigration visa requirements for people intending to move to other parts of New Zealand. Immigration from overseas into Auckland is partially offset by net emigration of people from Auckland to other regions of New Zealand. In 2021 and 2022, Auckland recorded its only decreases in population, primarily due to the COVID-19 pandemic and the associated lack of international migration. 

At the 2018 Census, 41.6 percent of the Auckland region's population were born overseas; in the local board areas of Upper Harbour, Waitemata, Puketapapa and Howick, overseas-born residents outnumbered those born in New Zealand. Auckland is home to over half (50.7 percent) of New Zealand's overseas-born population, including 70 percent of the country's Pacific Island and Northeast Asian-born populations, 61 percent of its Middle Eastern and North African-born population, and 60 percent of its Southern and Central Asian-born population. A study from 2016 showed Auckland has the fourth largest foreign-born population in the world, only behind Dubai, Toronto and Brussels, with 39% of its residents born overseas.

Religion

Around 48.5 percent of Aucklanders at the 2013 census affiliated with Christianity and 11.7 percent affiliated with non-Christian religions, while 37.8 percent of the population were irreligious and 3.8 percent objected to answering. Roman Catholicism is the largest Christian denomination with 13.3 percent affiliating, followed by Anglicanism (9.1 percent) and Presbyterianism (7.4 percent).

Recent immigration from Asia has added to the religious diversity of the city, increasing the number of people affiliating with Buddhism, Hinduism, Islam and Sikhism, although there are no figures on religious attendance. There is also a small, long-established Jewish community.

Future growth

Auckland is experiencing substantial population growth via immigration (two-thirds of growth) and natural population increases (one-third), and is set to grow to an estimated 1.9 million inhabitants by 2031 in a medium-variant scenario. This substantial increase in population will have a huge impact on transport, housing and other infrastructure that are, particularly in the case of housing, that are considered to be under pressure already. The high-variant scenario shows the region's population growing to over two million by 2031.

In July 2016, Auckland Council released, as the outcome of a three-year study and public hearings, its Unitary Plan for Auckland. The plan aims to free up to 30 percent more land for housing and allows for greater intensification of the existing urban area, creating 422,000 new dwellings in the next 30 years.

Culture and lifestyle

Auckland's lifestyle is influenced by the fact that while it is 70 percent rural in land area, 90 percent of Aucklanders live in urban areas – though large parts of these areas have a more suburban character than many cities in Europe and Asia.

Positive aspects of Auckland life are its mild climate, plentiful employment and educational opportunities, as well as numerous leisure facilities. Meanwhile, traffic problems, the lack of good public transport, and increasing housing costs have been cited by many Aucklanders as among the strongest negative factors of living there, together with crime that has been rising in recent years. Nonetheless, Auckland ranked third in a survey of the quality of life of 215 major cities of the world (2015 data).

Leisure

One of Auckland's nicknames, the "City of Sails", is derived from the popularity of sailing in the region. 135,000 yachts and launches are registered in Auckland, and around 60,500 of the country's 149,900 registered yachtsmen are from Auckland, with about one in three Auckland households owning a boat. The Viaduct Basin, on the western edge of the CBD, hosted three America's Cup challenges (2000 Cup, 2003 Cup and 2021 Cup).

The Waitematā Harbour is home to several notable yacht clubs and marinas, including the Royal New Zealand Yacht Squadron and Westhaven Marina, the largest of the Southern Hemisphere. The Waitematā Harbour has several swimming beaches, including Mission Bay and Kohimarama on the south side of the harbour, and Stanley Bay on the north side. On the eastern coastline of the North Shore, where the Rangitoto Channel divides the inner Hauraki Gulf islands from the mainland, there are popular swimming beaches at Cheltenham and Narrow Neck in Devonport, Takapuna, Milford, and the various beaches further north in the area known as East Coast Bays.

The west coast has popular surf beaches such as Piha, Muriwai and Te Henga (Bethells Beach). The Whangaparaoa Peninsula, Orewa, Omaha and Pakiri, to the north of the main urban area, are also nearby. Many Auckland beaches are patrolled by surf lifesaving clubs, such as Piha Surf Life Saving Club the home of Piha Rescue. All surf lifesaving clubs are part of the Surf Life Saving Northern Region.

Queen Street, Britomart, Ponsonby Road, Karangahape Road, Newmarket and Parnell are major retail areas. Major markets include those held in Ōtara and Avondale on weekend mornings. A number of shopping centres are located in the middle- and outer-suburbs, with Westfield Newmarket, Sylvia Park, Botany Town Centre and Westfield Albany being the largest.

Arts

A number of arts events are held in Auckland, including the Auckland Festival, the Auckland Triennial, the New Zealand International Comedy Festival, and the New Zealand International Film Festival. The Auckland Philharmonia Orchestra is the city and region's resident full-time symphony orchestra, performing its own series of concerts and accompanying opera and ballet. Events celebrating the city's cultural diversity include the Pasifika Festival, Polyfest, and the Auckland Lantern Festival, all of which are the largest of their kind in New Zealand. Additionally, Auckland regularly hosts the New Zealand Symphony Orchestra and Royal New Zealand Ballet. Auckland is part of the UNESCO Creative Cities Network in the category of music.

Important institutions include the Auckland Art Gallery, Auckland War Memorial Museum, New Zealand Maritime Museum, National Museum of the Royal New Zealand Navy, and the Museum of Transport and Technology. The Auckland Art Gallery is the largest stand-alone gallery in New Zealand with a collection of over 15,000 artworks, including prominent New Zealand and Pacific Island artists, as well as international painting, sculpture and print collections ranging in date from 1376 to the present day.

In 2009 the Gallery was promised a gift of fifteen works of art by New York art collectors and philanthropists Julian and Josie Robertson – including well-known paintings by Paul Cézanne, Pablo Picasso, Henri Matisse, Paul Gauguin and Piet Mondrian. This is the largest gift ever made to an art museum in Australasia.

Parks and nature 

Auckland Domain is one of the largest parks in the city, it is close to the Auckland CBD and has a good view of the Hauraki Gulf and Rangitoto Island. Smaller parks close to the city centre are Albert Park, Myers Park, Western Park and Victoria Park.

While most volcanic cones in the Auckland volcanic field have been affected by quarrying, many of the remaining cones are now within parks, and retain a more natural character than the surrounding city. Prehistoric earthworks and historic fortifications are in several of these parks, including Maungawhau / Mount Eden, North Head and Maungakiekie / One Tree Hill.

Other parks around the city are in Western Springs Reserve, which has a large park bordering the MOTAT museum and the Auckland Zoo. The Auckland Botanic Gardens are further south, in Manurewa.

Ferries provide transport to parks and nature reserves at Devonport, Waiheke Island, Rangitoto Island and Tiritiri Matangi. The Waitākere Ranges Regional Park to the west of Auckland has relatively unspoiled bush territory, as do the Hunua Ranges to the south.

Sport

Major sporting venues 
Rugby union, cricket, rugby league, association football (soccer) and netball are widely played and followed. Auckland has a considerable number of rugby union and cricket grounds, and venues for association football, netball, rugby league, basketball, hockey, ice hockey, motorsports, tennis, badminton, swimming, rowing, golf and many other sports.

There are also three racecourses within the city - (Ellerslie and Avondale for thoroughbred racing, and Alexandra Park for harness racing). A fourth racecourse is located at Pukekohe, straddling the boundary between Auckland and the neighbouring Waikato region. Greyhound racing is held at Manukau Stadium.

 Eden Park is the city's primary stadium and a frequent home for international rugby union and cricket matches, in addition to Super Rugby matches where the Blues play their home games. It is also the home ground of Auckland in the Mitre 10 Cup, and Auckland in domestic cricket. 
 Mt Smart Stadium is used mainly for rugby league matches and is home to the New Zealand Warriors of the NRL, and is also used for concerts, previously hosting the Auckland leg of the Big Day Out music festival every January as well as the 1990 Commonwealth Games.
 North Harbour Stadium is mainly used for rugby union and football (soccer) matches, but is also used for concerts. It is the home ground for North Harbour in the Mitre 10 Cup. In 2019 it became the home field of New Zealand's only professional baseball team, Auckland Tuatara.
 ASB Tennis Centre is Auckland's primary tennis venue, hosting international tournaments for men and women (ASB Classic) in January each year. ASB Bank took over the sponsorship of the men's tournament from 2016, the event formerly being known as the Heineken Open.
 Spark Arena, previously known as Vector Arena is an indoor auditorium primarily used for concerts and is the home of the New Zealand Breakers basketball team. It also hosts international netball.
 Trusts Arena is an indoor venue which primarily hosts netball matches, and is the home of the Northern Mystics of the ANZ Premiership. It is also where the 2007 World Netball Championships were held. Since 2015, an annual event on the World Series of Darts has been held there.
 North Shore Events Centre is an indoor arena which is used for a variety of sporting events, as well as concerts and expos. It was formerly home to the New Zealand Breakers and hosted much of the 2009 FIBA Under-19 World Championship.
 Vodafone Events Centre is an indoor arena which hosts a variety of events, and is the home of the Northern Stars netball team of the ANZ Premiership.
 Pukekohe Park Raceway is a motorsports and thoroughbred horse-racing venue that hosts a leg of the V8 Supercars series annually, along with other motorsports events.  The most important horse-racing meeting is held annually at the end of November, featuring the Group 2 Counties Cup and three other stakes races.
 Western Springs Stadium has since 1929 hosted speedway racing during the summer. It also hosts concerts, with many of New Zealand's largest-ever concerts having taken place at the stadium. It is also the home of Ponsonby RFC.

Major teams
Sporting teams based in Auckland who compete in national or trans-national competitions are as follows:
 Formerly Auckland Blues, the Blues compete in Super Rugby. Auckland is also home to three Mitre 10 Cup rugby union teams: Auckland, North Harbour and Counties Manukau.
 Previously Auckland Warriors, the New Zealand Warriors are a team in Australia's National Rugby League competition. They play their home games at Mt Smart Stadium. The Akarana Falcons and Counties Manukau compete in the National Competition.
 Auckland's men's first class cricket team, the Auckland Aces, play their home matches at Eden Park, generally on the outer oval. The women's team, the Auckland Hearts, play at Melville Park in Epsom.
 Auckland City, Waitakere United, and Eastern Suburbs football teams play in the ISPS Handa Premiership.
 Northern Mystics and Northern Stars are netball teams who compete in the ANZ Premiership. The Mystics play their home games at Trusts Stadium and the Stars at the Vodafone Events Centre.
 New Zealand Breakers are a basketball team who compete in the Australian National Basketball League and play their home games primarily at Spark Arena. The Auckland Tuatara and Franklin Bulls play in the New Zealand National Basketball League.
 Botany Swarm and West Auckland Admirals compete in the New Zealand Ice Hockey League.
 Auckland Tuatara compete in the Australian Baseball League.

Major events

Annual sporting events held in Auckland include:
 The ATP Auckland Open and the WTA Auckland Open (both known for sponsorship reasons as the ASB Classic), are men's and women's tennis tournaments, respectively, which are held annually at the ASB Tennis Centre in January. The men's tournament has been held since 1956, and the women's tournament since 1986.
 The Auckland Super400 (known for sponsorship reasons as the ITM Auckland Super 400) is a Supercars Championship race held at Pukekohe Park Raceway. The race has been held intermittently since 1996
 The Auckland Marathon (and half-marathon) is an annual marathon. It is the largest marathon in New Zealand and draws in the vicinity of 15,000 entrants. It has been held annually since 1992.
 The Auckland Anniversary Regatta is a sailing regatta which has been held annually since 1840, the year of Auckland's founding. It is held over Auckland Anniversary weekend and attracts several hundred entrants each year. It is the largest such regatta, and the oldest sporting event, in New Zealand.
 Auckland Cup Week is an annual horse racing carnival, which has been held in early March since its inception in 2006. It is the richest such carnival in New Zealand, and incorporates several of New Zealand's major thoroughbred horse races, including the Auckland Cup, held since 1874, and New Zealand Derby, held since 1875.
 The Auckland Harbour Crossing Swim is an annual summer swimming event. The swim crosses the Waitematā Harbour, from the North Shore to the Viaduct Basin covering 2.8 km (often with some considerable counter-currents). The event has been held since 2004 and attracts over a thousand mostly amateur entrants each year, making it New Zealand's largest ocean swim.
 Round the Bays is an annual fun-run. The course travels eastwards along the Auckland waterfront, with the run starting in the CBD and ending in St Heliers, the total length being . It is the largest fun-run in New Zealand and attracts tens of thousands of entrants each year, with the number of entrants reported to have peaked at 80,000 in 1982. It has been held annually since 1972.

Major events previously held in Auckland include the 1950 British Empire Games and the Commonwealth Games in 1990, and a number of matches (including the semi-finals and the final) of the 1987 Rugby World Cup and 2011 Rugby World Cup. Auckland hosted the America's Cup and Louis Vuitton Cup in 2000, 2003, and 2021. The 2007 World Netball Championships were held at the Trusts Stadium. The ITU World Triathlon Series held a Grand Final event in the Auckland CBD from 2012 until 2015.  The NRL Auckland Nines was a rugby league nines preseason competition played at Eden Park from 2014 to 2017. The 2017 World Masters Games were held at a number of venues around Auckland. The Auckland Darts Masters was held annually at The Trusts Arena from 2015 to 2018.

Architecture

Auckland comprises a diversity of architectural styles owing to its early beginnings as a settlement, to the Victorian era right through to the contemporary era of the late 20th century. The city has legislation in effect to protect the remaining heritage, with the key piece of legislation being the Resource Management Act of 1991. Prepared under this legislation is the Auckland Unitary Plan which indicates how land can be used or developed. Prominent historic buildings in Auckland include the Dilworth Building, the Auckland Ferry Terminal, Guardian Trust Building, Old Customs House, Landmark House, the Auckland Town Hall and the Britomart Transport Centre–many of these are located on the main thoroughfare of Queen Street.

Economy

Auckland is the major economic and financial centre of New Zealand. It has an advanced market economy with strengths in finance, commerce, and tourism. Most major international corporations have an Auckland office; the most expensive office space is around lower Queen Street and the Viaduct Basin in the Auckland CBD, where many financial and business services are located, which make up a large percentage of the CBD economy. The largest commercial and industrial areas of the Auckland Region are Auckland CBD and the western parts of Manukau, mostly bordering the Manukau Harbour and the Tāmaki River estuary.

Auckland is classified by the Globalization and World Cities Research Network as a Beta + world city because of its importance in commerce, the arts, and education.

According to the 2013 census, the primary employment industries of Auckland residents are professional, scientific and technical services (11.4 percent), manufacturing (9.9 percent), retail trade (9.7 percent), health care and social assistance (9.1 percent), and education and training (8.3 percent). Manufacturing is the largest employer in the Henderson-Massey, Howick, Māngere-Ōtāhuhu, Ōtara-Papatoetoe, Manurewa and Papakura local board areas, retail trade is the largest employer in the Whau local board area, while professional, scientific and technical services are the largest employer in the remaining urban local board areas.

The sub-national GDP of the Auckland region was estimated at NZ$122 billion in 2022, almost 40 percent of New Zealand's national GDP. The per-capita GDP of Auckland was estimated at $71,978, the third-highest in the country after the Taranaki and Wellington regions, and above the national average of $62,705.

In 2014, the median personal income (for all persons older than 15 years of age, per year) in Auckland was estimated at $41,860, behind only Wellington.

Housing

Housing varies considerably between some suburbs having state owned housing in the lower income neighbourhoods, to palatial waterfront estates, especially in areas close to the Waitematā Harbour. Traditionally, the most common residence of Aucklanders was a standalone dwelling on a 'quarter acre' (1,000 m2). However, subdividing such properties with 'infill housing' has long been the norm. Auckland's housing stock has become more diverse in recent decades, with many more apartments being built since the 1970s – particularly since the 1990s in the CBD. Nevertheless, the majority of Aucklanders live in single dwelling housing and are expected to continue to do so – even with most of future urban growth being through intensification.

Auckland's housing is amongst the least affordable in the world, based on comparing average house prices with average household income levels and house prices have grown way well above the rate of inflation in recent decades. In August 2022, the Real Estate Institute of New Zealand (REINZ) reported the median house price in the Auckland region was $1,100,000, ranging from $900,000 in the former Papakura District area to $1,285,000 in the former North Shore City area, This is compared to a median price of $700,000 outside of Auckland. There is significant public debate around why Auckland's housing is so expensive, often referring to a lack of land supply, the easy availability of credit for residential investment and Auckland's high level of liveability.

In some areas, the Victorian villas have been torn down to make way for redevelopment. The demolition of the older houses is being combated through increased heritage protection for older parts of the city. Auckland has been described as having 'the most extensive range of timbered housing with its classical details and mouldings in the world', many of them Victorian-Edwardian style houses.

Housing crisis
In the lead-up to 2010, a housing crisis began in Auckland with the market not being able to sustain the demand for affordable homes. The Housing Accords and Special Housing Areas Act 2013 mandated that a minimum of 10 percent of new builds in certain housing areas be subsidised to make them affordable for buyers who had incomes on par with the national average. In a new subdivision at Hobsonville Point, 20 percent of new homes were reduced to below $550,000. Some of the demand for new housing at this time was attributed to the 43,000 people who moved into Auckland between June 2014 and June 2015. Research has found that Auckland is set to become even more densely populated in future which could ease the burden by creating higher density housing in the city centre. From around November 2021 to May 2022, house prices dropped 11.68%. It has continued to fall since due to inflation, bank interest rates, and a variety of other factors.

Government

Local

The Auckland Council is the local authority with jurisdiction over the city of Auckland, along with surrounding rural areas, parkland, and the islands of the Hauraki Gulf.

From 1989 to 2010, Auckland was governed by several city and district councils, with regional oversight by Auckland Regional Council. In the late 2000s, New Zealand's central government and parts of Auckland's society felt that this large number of councils, and the lack of strong regional government (with the Auckland Regional Council having only limited powers), were hindering Auckland's progress.

A Royal Commission on Auckland Governance was set up in 2007, and in 2009 it recommended a unified local governance structure for Auckland by amalgamating the councils. The government subsequently announced that a "super city" would be set up with a single mayor by the time of New Zealand's local body elections in 2010.

In October 2010, Manukau City mayor Len Brown was elected mayor of the amalgamated Auckland Council. He was re-elected for a second term in October 2013. Brown did not stand for re-election in the 2016 mayoral election, and was succeeded by successful candidate Phil Goff in October 2016. Twenty councillors make up the remainder of the Auckland Council governing body, elected from thirteen electoral wards.

National

Between 1842 and 1865, Auckland was the capital city of New Zealand. Parliament met in what is now Old Government House on the University of Auckland's City campus. The capital was moved to the more centrally located Wellington in 1865.

Auckland, because of its large population, is covered by 22 general electorates and three Māori electorates, each returning one member to the New Zealand House of Representatives. The governing Labour Party holds eleven general electorates and all three Māori electorates; the opposing National Party holds nine general electorates; and ACT and the Greens hold one apiece ( and ).

Other
The administrative offices of the Government of the Pitcairn Islands is situated in Auckland.

Education

Primary and secondary

The Auckland urban area has 340 primary schools, 80 secondary schools, and 29 composite (primary/secondary combined) schools as of February 2012, catering for nearly quarter of a million students. The majority are state schools, but 63 schools are state-integrated and 39 are private.

The city is home to some of the largest schools in terms of students in New Zealand, including Mt Albert Grammar School, the second largest school in New Zealand with a student population of 3035, and Rangitoto College in the East Coast Bays area, the largest school in New Zealand with  students as of

Tertiary

Auckland has some of the largest universities in the country. Five of New Zealand's eight universities have campuses in Auckland as well as eight of New Zealand's fifteen polytechnics. The University of Auckland, Auckland University of Technology, Manukau Institute of Technology, and Unitec Institute of Technology are all based in Auckland. Despite being based in other regions, the University of Otago, Victoria University of Wellington, Massey University, and several polytechnics have satellite campuses in Auckland.

Auckland is a major centre of overseas language education, with large numbers of foreign students (particularly East Asians) coming to the city for several months or years to learn English or study at universities – although numbers New Zealand-wide have dropped substantially since peaking in 2003. , there are around 50 New Zealand Qualifications Authority (NZQA) certified schools and institutes teaching English in the Auckland area.

Transport

The State Highway network connects the different parts of Auckland, with State Highway 1 being the major north–south thoroughfare through the city (including both the Northern and Southern Motorways) and the main connection to the adjoining regions of Northland and Waikato. The Northern Busway runs alongside part of the Northern Motorway on the North Shore. Other state highways within Auckland include State Highway 16 (the Northwest Motorway), State Highway 18 (the Upper Harbour Motorway) and State Highway 20 (the Southwest Motorway). State Highway 22 is a non-motorway rural arterial connecting Pukekohe to the Southern Motorway at Drury.

The Auckland Harbour Bridge, opened in 1959, is the main connection between the North Shore and the rest of the Auckland region. The bridge provides eight lanes of vehicle traffic and has a moveable median barrier for lane flexibility, but does not provide access for rail, pedestrians or cyclists. The Central Motorway Junction, also called 'Spaghetti Junction' for its complexity, is the intersection between the two major motorways of Auckland (State Highway 1 and State Highway 16).

Two of the longest arterial roads within the Auckland Region are Great North Road and Great South Road – the main connections in those directions before the construction of the State Highway network. Numerous arterial roads also provide regional and sub-regional connectivity, with many of these roads (especially on the isthmus) previously used to operate Auckland's former tram network.

Auckland has four railway lines (Western, Onehunga, Eastern and Southern). These lines serve the western, southern and eastern parts of Auckland from the Britomart Transport Centre in downtown Auckland, the terminal station for all lines, where connections are also available to ferry and bus services. Work began in late 2015 to provide more route flexibility and connect Britomart more directly to western suburbs on the Western Line via an underground rail tunnel known as the City Rail Link project. A light rail network is also planned.

Travel modes

Road and rail
Private vehicles are the main form of transportation within Auckland, with around seven percent of journeys in the Auckland region undertaken by bus in 2006, and two percent undertaken by train and ferry. For trips to the city centre at peak times the use of public transport is much higher, with more than half of trips undertaken by bus, train or ferry. In 2010 Auckland ranked quite low in its use of public transport, having only 46 public transport trips per capita per year, while Wellington has almost twice this number at 91, and Sydney has 114 trips. This strong roading focus results in substantial traffic congestion during peak times. This car reliance means 56% of the city's energy usage goes towards transportation and  emissions will increase by 20% in the next 10 years.

Bus services in Auckland are mostly radial, with few cross-town routes. Late-night services (i.e. past midnight) are limited, even on weekends. A major overhaul of Auckland's bus services was implemented during 2016–18, significantly expanding the reach of "frequent" bus services: those that operate at least every 15 minutes during the day and early evening, every day of the week. Auckland is connected with other cities through bus services operated by InterCity.

Rail services operate along four lines between the CBD and the west, south and south-east of Auckland, with longer-distance trains operating to Wellington only a few times each week. Following the opening of Britomart Transport Centre in 2003, major investment in Auckland's rail network occurred, involving station upgrades, rolling stock refurbishment and infrastructure improvements. The rail upgrade has included electrification of Auckland's rail network, with electric trains constructed by Construcciones y Auxiliar de Ferrocarriles commencing service in April 2014. A number of proposed projects to further extend Auckland's rail network were included in the 2012 Auckland Plan, including the City Rail Link, the Auckland Airport Line, the Avondale-Southdown Line and rail to the North Shore.

Other modes
Auckland's ports are the second largest of the country, behind the Port of Tauranga, and a large part of both inbound and outbound New Zealand commerce travels through them, mostly via the facilities northeast of Auckland CBD. Freight usually arrives at or is distributed from the port via road, though the port facilities also have rail access. Auckland is a major cruise ship stopover point, with the ships usually tying up at Princes Wharf. Auckland CBD is connected to coastal suburbs, to the North Shore and to outlying islands by ferry.

Air
Auckland has various small regional airports and Auckland Airport, the busiest of the country. Auckland Airport, New Zealand's largest, is in the southern suburb of Māngere on the shores of the Manukau Harbour. There are frequent services to Australia, and to other New Zealand destinations. There are also direct connections to many locations in the South Pacific, as well as the United States, China, Asia, Vancouver, London, Santiago and Buenos Aires. In terms of international flights, Auckland is the second-best connected city in Oceania.

Policies
Research at Griffith University has indicated that from the 1950s to the 1980s, Auckland engaged in some of the most pro-automobile transport policies anywhere in the world. With public transport declining heavily during the second half of the 20th century (a trend mirrored in most Western countries such as the US), and increased spending on roads and cars, New Zealand (and specifically Auckland) now has the second-highest vehicle ownership rate in the world, with around 578 vehicles per 1000 people. Auckland has also been called a very pedestrian- and cyclist-unfriendly city, though some efforts are being made to change this, with Auckland being a major participant in the government's "Urban Cycleways" initiative, and with the "SkyPath" project for a walk and cycleway on the Auckland Harbour Bridge having received Council support, and planning consent.

Infrastructure and services

Electricity

Vector owns and operates the majority of the distribution network in urban Auckland, with Counties Energy owning and operating the network south of central Papakura. The city is supplied from Transpower's national grid from thirteen substations across the city. There are no major electricity generation stations located within the city or north of Auckland, so almost all of the electricity for Auckland and Northland must be transmitted from power stations in the south, mainly from Huntly Power Station and the Waikato River hydroelectric stations. The city had two natural gas-fired power stations (the 380 MW Otahuhu B and the 175 MW Southdown), but both shut down in 2015.

There have been several notable power outages in Auckland. The five-week-long 1998 Auckland power crisis blacked out much of the CBD after a cascade failure occurred on the four main underground cables supplying the CBD. The 2006 Auckland Blackout interrupted supply to the CBD and many inner suburbs after an earth wire shackle at Transpower's Otahuhu substation broke and short-circuited the lines supplying the inner city.

In 2009, much of the northern and western suburbs, as well as all of Northland, experienced a blackout when a forklift accidentally came into contact with the Ōtāhuhu to Henderson 220 kV line, the only major line supplying the region. Transpower spent $1.25 billion in the early 2010s reinforcing the supply into and across Auckland, including a 400 kV-capable transmission line from the Waikato River to Brownhill substation (operating initially at 220 kV), and 220 kV underground cables between Brownhill and Pakuranga, and between Pakuranga and Albany via the CBD. These reduced the Auckland Region's reliance on Otahuhu substation and northern and western Auckland's reliance on the Ōtāhuhu to Henderson line.

Natural gas
Auckland was one of the original nine towns and cities in New Zealand to be supplied with natural gas when the Kapuni gas field entered production in 1970 and a 340 km long high pressure pipeline from the field in Taranaki to the city was completed. Auckland was connected to the Maui gas field in 1982 following the completion of a high pressure pipeline from the Maui gas pipeline near Huntly, via the city, to Whangarei in Northland.

The high pressure transmission pipelines supplying the city are now owned and operated by First Gas, with Vector owning and operating the medium and low pressure distribution pipelines in the city.

Tourism

Prior to the COVID-19 pandemic of 2020 onwards, Auckland-related tourism boosted the New Zealand economy. Many tourists visiting New Zealand would arrive via Auckland Airport, and cruise ships also called.

Tourist attractions and landmarks in Auckland include:

Attractions and buildings
 Aotea Square – the main square within the CBD, adjacent to Queen Street. It hosts rallies and arts festivals.
 Auckland Civic Theatre – an internationally significant atmospheric theatre built in 1929. It was renovated in 2000 to its original condition.
 Auckland Harbour Bridge – connecting central Auckland and the North Shore, an iconic symbol of Auckland.
 Auckland Town Hall – with its concert hall considered to have some of the finest acoustics in the world , this 1911 building serves both council and entertainment functions.
 Auckland War Memorial Museum – a large multi-exhibition museum in the Auckland Domain, known for its impressive neo-classicist style, built in 1929.
 Aotea Centre – Auckland Civic Centre building completed in 1989.
 Britomart Transport Centre – the main CBD public transport centre, in a historic Edwardian building.
 Eden Park – the city's primary stadium and a host of international rugby union and cricket matches. It hosted the 1987 and 2011 Rugby World Cup finals.
 Karangahape Road – known as "K' Road", a street in upper central Auckland with bars, clubs, smaller shops, and a former red-light district.
 Kelly Tarlton's Sea Life Aquarium – an aquarium and Antarctic environment in the eastern suburb of Mission Bay, built in a set of former sewage-storage tanks. It showcases penguins, turtles, sharks, tropical fish, stingrays and other marine creatures.
 MOTAT – the Museum of Transport and Technology, at Western Springs.
 Mt Smart Stadium – a stadium used mainly for rugby league and soccer matches, and also for concerts.
 New Zealand Maritime Museum – features exhibitions and collections relating to New Zealand maritime history at Hobson Wharf, adjacent to Viaduct Harbour.
 Ponsonby – a suburb and main street immediately west of central Auckland, known for arts, cafes, culture and historic villas.
 Queen Street – the main commercial thoroughfare of the CBD, running from Karangahape Road downhill to the harbour.
 Rainbow's End – amusement park with over 20 rides and attractions, based in Manukau.
 St Patrick's Cathedral – the Catholic Cathedral of Auckland. A 19th-century Gothic building which was renovated from 2003 to 2007 for refurbishment and structural support.
 Spark Arena – events centre in downtown Auckland completed in 2007. Holding 12,000 people, it is used for sports and concert events.
 Viaduct Harbour – formerly an industrial harbour, the basin was re-developed as a marina and residential area in the 1990s. It served as a base for the America's Cup regattas in 2000 and 2003.
 Western Springs Stadium – a natural amphitheatre used mainly for speedway races, rock and pop concerts.

Natural landmarks
 Auckland Domain – built atop the tuff ring of the Pukekawa volcano in 1843, the domain is the oldest and one of the largest parks in the city. Located at the intersection of the suburbs of Parnell, Newmarket, and Grafton, it is close to the CBD and offers a clear view of the harbour and of Rangitoto Island. Auckland War Memorial Museum is located at the highest point in the park.
  Maungawhau / Mount Eden – a volcanic cone with a grassy crater. The highest natural point on the Auckland isthmus, it offers 360-degree views of the city and is thus a popular tourist outlook.
 Maungakiekie / One Tree Hill – a volcanic cone that dominates the skyline of the southern inner suburbs. It no longer has a tree on the summit (after a politically motivated attack on the erstwhile tree) but is crowned by an obelisk.
 Rangitoto Island – an island which guards the entrance to Waitematā Harbour and forms a prominent feature on the eastern horizon. The island was formed by a volcanic eruption approximately 600 years ago, making it both the youngest and the largest volcano in the Auckland Volcanic Field. The island reaches a height of 260 m, and offers panoramic views across Auckland.
 Takarunga / Mount Victoria and Maungauika (North Head) – nearby volcanic cones in Devonport, both of which offer views of the Waitematā Harbour and  CBD. Both hills were fortified with artillery and bunkers in the late 19th century and were maintained as coastal defences until the 1950s.
The island is an open nature-reserve which is managed under the supervision of the Department of Conservation. It is specifically noted for its bird life, including takahē, North Island kōkako and kiwi.
It is known for its beaches, forests, vineyards and olive groves.
A significant portion of the hills lie within a regional park, which includes numerous bush-walking tracks.

Cultural references 
 Fans of Auckland sometimes like to quote Rudyard Kipling's invocation of the city's remoteness: "Last, loneliest, loveliest, exquisite, apart", from his poem "The Song of the Cities" (1893).

 Different works of Robert Heinlein refer to a fictional human colony on Venus as "New Auckland".

Notable people

Sister cities
Auckland Council maintains relationships with the following cities.

Sister cities
  Los Angeles, United States (1971)
  Utsunomiya, Japan (1982)
  Fukuoka, Japan (1986)
  Brisbane, Australia (1988)
  Guangzhou, China (1989)
  Kakogawa, Japan (1992)
  Busan, South Korea (1996)
  Taichung, Taiwan (1996)
  Ningbo, China (1998)
  Qingdao, China (2008)

Friendship and Cooperation cities
  Tomioka, Japan (1983)
  Shinagawa, Japan (1993)
  Galway, Ireland (2002)
  Nadi, Fiji (2006)
  Hamburg, Germany (2007)
  Pohang, South Korea (2008)

See also

 Jafa, a slang term for Aucklander

Notes

References

External links

 Auckland – Visitor-oriented official website
 Auckland travel guide – NewZealand.com (New Zealand's official visitor guide and information)
 Auckland in Te Ara the Encyclopedia of New Zealand
 Maps and aerial photos (from the ARC map website)

 
Former national capitals of New Zealand
Former provincial capitals of New Zealand
Populated coastal places in New Zealand
Populated places established in 1840
1840 establishments in New Zealand
Port cities in New Zealand
Former colonial capitals